Jeremy Wayne Clements (born January 16, 1985) is an American professional stock car racing driver. He is the son of Tony Clements, owner of Clements Racing Engines. He competes full-time in the NASCAR Xfinity Series, driving the No. 51 Chevrolet Camaro for Jeremy Clements Racing.

Early career
A native of Spartanburg, South Carolina, Clements began his racing career at the age of 8 by driving go-karts. In 1999, he moved on to race four-cylinder cars in both the Modified and Stock Series at Thunder Valley Speedway and Cherokee Speedway. Over the next three seasons, he won 55 feature events and two track championships.

Late Model and ARCA
In 2002, Clements moved up to the Late Model division where he won 9 overall races as well as the championship at Cherokee. He also made his ARCA Series debut at Talladega Superspeedway, starting 6th and finishing 17th in the No. 3 Chevrolet. He started five ARCA races in 2003, earning three top 10s. Clements was seriously injured on July 24, 2004, at age 19, while racing at 311 Speedway in North Carolina. While driving his late model, the driveshaft broke and pierced through the vehicle, injuring his right hand. He was immediately taken to Wake Forest University Baptist Hospital in Winston-Salem, N.C., where he underwent a nine-hour orthopedic surgery. In the following year, Clements went through ten surgeries; including sewing his hand to his right side hip for a skin graft, using bone grafts from his hip, and taking tendons from his right foot. He did not race again until the following year.

On July 10, 2005, Clements got back behind the wheel of a racecar for the first time since the accident, testing his late model at Thunder Valley. He made his ARCA return at Chicagoland Speedway in September. In 2006, he ran 10 races in the ARCA series in Ken Appling's No. 3 Chevrolet. He earned four top-10s, including three consecutive top-5s. He was also selected by General Motors to participate in a three-track test with Richard Childress Racing. Clements had a career season in 2007, earning eight top-10s in 12 races. On August 11, 2007, at Nashville Superspeedway, he earned his only ARCA win to date after starting 2nd and leading 48 laps. In 2008, Clements ran seven races. He earned 5 top-10s and narrowly missed repeating his win at Nashville, finishing 2nd.

Xfinity Series

2003
Clements made his debut in the NASCAR Xfinity Series (then NASCAR Busch Series) in 2003 at Pikes Peak International Raceway. Driving the No. 71 Chevrolet for Young Racing, he started 35th and finished 31st after an early crash.

2007
Clements did not return to the NASCAR Xfinity Series again until 2007 in which Clements signed with McGill Motorsports to run the last five races of the season in their No. 36 Chevrolet. He only finished two races and had a best finish of 23rd at Charlotte Motor Speedway.

2008
In 2008, he attempted four races for his family-owned No. 50 team. He qualified for two of them, earning finishes of 22nd and 30th. During these two years, he also spent time practicing and qualifying cars for Joe Gibbs Racing in races that conflicted with the Monster Energy NASCAR Cup Series schedule.

2009
For 2009, Clements increased his focus on the Xfinity Series, attempting 13 races and making 12. He ran six races in his family-owned No. 50 with a best finish of 16th. Shortly before the October race at Kansas Speedway, Clements and sponsor Saxon Group joined forces with JD Motorsports to finish out the season in the No. 0 Chevrolet. In his 2nd race with JD, he finished a then-career best 12th at Auto Club Speedway.

2010
In the offseason, it was announced that Clements would drive at least the first three races of the 2010 season in the No. 0 for JD Motorsports with sponsorship from Boudreaux's Butt Paste. After missing the field at Daytona due to qualifying being rained out, his plans for the rest of the reason were up in the air. The No. 0 team was shut down and JD moved Clements to the No. 04. He attempted the next two races as planned, but failed to qualify for both of them. Clements made his first race of the season in April at Nashville Superspeedway, finishing 22nd. He attempted 19 more races, qualifying for 15 of them. Clements earned his first career top-10 at Gateway International Raceway in October, finishing 10th and also leading six laps (the first laps led of his career).

2011

In 2011, Clements competed in all 34 races, finishing 15th in points. He had no top-ten finishes, but had three 14th-place finishes and ten top-twenty finishes during the season.

2012
For 2012, Clements continued in the Xfinity Series with his team. He drove two races for JD Motorsports at Richmond and Indianapolis when Ty Dillon was using his 51. Clements had two top-10 finishes.

2013
After finishing 33rd in the first race of the 2013 NASCAR Nationwide Series season, Clements was suspended indefinitely by NASCAR on February 27, 2013. The sanctioning body stated that the suspension was due to violations of the NASCAR Code of Conduct, as defined in Section 7–5 of the sanctioning body's rulebook, as well as Section 12–1, actions detrimental to stock car racing. Clements, in an interview with ESPN, was later quoted as saying, "When you say 'racial' remark, it wasn't used to describe anybody or anything. So that's all I'm going to say to that. And it really wasn't. I was describing racing, and the word I used was incorrect and I shouldn't have said it. It shouldn't be used at all." The MTV editor who had the conversation with Clements, Marty Beckerman, confirmed that Clements said a phrase which included the "n-word". Clements sat out two races and returned for the rest of the season. His season was highlighted by top-ten finishes at the huge Talladega Superspeedway tri-oval and the series' inaugural race at the Mid-Ohio Sports Car Course.

2014
After several equipment setbacks in the 2014 NASCAR Nationwide Series, Clements had a brief moment in the top 5 in the Aaron’s 312 at Talladega Superspeedway on May 3, 2014, before a crash forced him out with four laps to go. Ryan Blaney, who was in second at the time, ricocheted off the wall into Clements, and sent his car hard into the wall. At the Gardner Denver 200 at Road America, Clements recorded a then career-best sixth-place finish.

2015
2015 was a decent season for Clements despite a best finish of 10th at Dover and a handful of poor finishes.

2016
At Talladega in 2016, Clements led laps under caution and recorded his first Xfinity top-five finish, a fourth.

2017

In 2017, Clements scored a top 10 outing at Iowa, in which he finished seventh. A few races later, he would score his first career win at Road America after he and Matt Tifft got together with 2 laps to go. Clements' win was the first for an independent Xfinity Series driver and team not affiliated with NASCAR's Cup Series since David Gilliland won at Kentucky in 2006.

2022
In 2022, Clements scored his second career win at the Daytona night race on overtime, earning him a playoff appearance at first. However, NASCAR issued the team an L2 penalty four days later after the post-race inspection discovered an illegally modified intake manifold. Clements kept the win, but was declared ineligible for the playoffs. In addition, crew chief Mark Setzer was fined 60,000 and the team was docked 75 owner and driver points, plus 10 playoff points should the team qualify for the postseason. Clements's appeal was heard on September 13; panel members Tom DeLoach, Richard Gore and Dixon Johnston found in Clements's favor, rescinding the penalty and revoking the punishments. As a result, he regained his eligibility for the 2022 playoffs. On October 18, Setzer was suspended for one race and fined 25,000 for an L1 Penalty under Section 14.4.B.E, which deals with the modification of a composite body part following the Las Vegas race. In addition, the No. 51 has been docked 40 driver and owner points. Clements would wind up finishing 12th in the points standings.

Motorsports career results

NASCAR
(key) (Bold – Pole position awarded by qualifying time. Italics – Pole position earned by points standings or practice time. * – Most laps led.)

Xfinity Series

 Season still in progress
 Ineligible for series points

ARCA Re/Max Series
(key) (Bold – Pole position awarded by qualifying time. Italics – Pole position earned by points standings or practice time. * – Most laps led.)

References

External links

 
 

Living people
1984 births
Sportspeople from Spartanburg, South Carolina
Racing drivers from South Carolina
NASCAR drivers
ARCA Menards Series drivers